Ecsenius oculus, known commonly in Micronesia as the ocular blenny and as the coral blenny on Christmas Island, is a species of combtooth blenny in the genus Ecsenius. It is found in coral reefs in the western Pacific ocean. It can reach a maximum length of 7 centimetres. Blennies in this species feed primarily off of plants, including benthic algae and weeds, and are commercial aquarium fish.

References
 Springer, V. G. 1971 (30 Mar.) Revision of the fish genus Ecsenius (Blenniidae, Blenniinae, Salariini). Smithsonian Contributions to Zoology No. 72: 1-74.

oculus
Fish described in 1971
Taxa named by Victor G. Springer